Linda J. Miller (born August 27, 1947) is the Iowa State Representative from the 94th District. A Republican, she has served in the Iowa House of Representatives since 2007.

, Miller serves on several committees in the Iowa House - the Education and Labor committees.  She also serves as the chair of the Human Resources committee and as a member of the Health and Human Services Appropriations Subcommittee, the Medical Assistance Projections and Assistance Council, the Governmental Public Health Advisory Council, and the Medical Assistance Advisory Council.

Miller was first elected in 2006, defeating incumbent Republican Joe Hutter in the primary.  Miller won a subsequent rematch in the general election, after Hutter decided to run as an independent candidate.

Electoral history
*incumbent

References

External links

Representative Linda Miller official Iowa General Assembly site
 
Profile at Iowa House Republicans

Republican Party members of the Iowa House of Representatives
Living people
1947 births
Women state legislators in Iowa
Place of birth missing (living people)
People from Creston, Iowa
21st-century American politicians
21st-century American women politicians